Rustam Akhmetov (born 17 May 1950) is a retired high jumper who represented the Soviet Union.

Biography
He was born in Berdychiv, Ukrainian SSR, and was affiliated with the VSS Avangard in Berdychiv.

He won bronze medals at the 1968 European Junior Championships and the 1971 European Championships, and finished eighth in the high jump final at the 1972 Olympic Games. He became Soviet high jump champion in 1971, rivalling with Sergey Budalov and Kestutis Šapka.

His personal best jump was 2.23 metres, achieved in 1971.

He received a Ph.D. degree in 1979 and Doctor of Science degree in 2007.

References

Soviet male high jumpers
Ukrainian male high jumpers
Athletes (track and field) at the 1972 Summer Olympics
Olympic athletes of the Soviet Union
1950 births
Living people
European Athletics Championships medalists
Laureates of the Diploma of the Verkhovna Rada of Ukraine
Sportspeople from Zhytomyr Oblast